Burlington County is a county in the South Jersey region of the U.S. state of New Jersey. The county is the largest by area in New Jersey. Its county seat is Mount Holly.  As of the 2020 census, the county was the state's 11th-most-populous county, with a population of 461,860, its highest decennial count ever and an increase of 13,126 (+2.9%) from the 2010 census count of 448,734, which in turn reflected an increase of 25,340 (6.0%) from the 423,394 enumerated in the 2000 census. The most populous place in the county was Evesham Township with 46,826 residents as of the 2020 census. Washington Township covered , the largest area of any municipality in the county.

Burlington County is located east of the Delaware River and borders Philadelphia, the nation's sixth-largest city. It is part of the Philadelphia-Camden-Vineland, PA-NJ-DE-MD combined statistical area, also known as the Delaware Valley. However, the county stretches across the state, and its southeast corner reaches tidal estuaries leading to New Jersey's Great Bay, which separates the county from the Atlantic Ocean.

History

Etymology
Anglo-European records of Burlington County date to 1681, when its court was established in the Province of West Jersey. The county was formed on May 17, 1694, "by the union of the first and second Tenths." The county was named for Bridlington, a town in England.

History
Burlington County was also the seat of government for the Province of West Jersey until its amalgamation with East Jersey in 1702, forming the Province of New Jersey. The county was much larger and was partitioned to form additional counties as the population increased. In 1714 one partition to the north became Hunterdon County, which itself was later partitioned to form three additional counties (Morris, Sussex and Warren). The county seat had been in Burlington but, as the population increased in the interior, away from the Delaware River, a more central location was needed, and the seat of government was moved to Mount Holly in 1793. Increasing industrialization led to improvements in transportation which increased the profitability of agriculture in the county. Population increases in the coastal communities due to successful international trade and ship repair led to road improvements throughout the county.

Geography and climate

Most of the county's land is coastal and alluvial plain with little relief. The low point is sea level along the Delaware and Mullica rivers.

Most of the land is dotted with rivers, streams, and wetlands. Some of the largest and most important rivers in Burlington County include Rancocas Creek, Assiscunk Creek, Pennsauken Creek, Mullica River, Batsto River, and Wading River.

According to the Köppen climate classification, Burlington County has a humid subtropical climate (Cfa), with relatively cool to cold winters and hot summers.

Severe weather is common in the warm months. Hurricanes have struck Burlington County on occasion, but tornadoes are uncommon. Severe thunderstorms, however, are common during the warm season. Snowfall is typical in the winter, with the snowfall averages in the county ranging from about 18 to 22 inches. The nearby Atlantic Ocean moderates Burlington County's climate, and rain is common year-round. The county seat receives about 41 inches of rain per year.

Another interesting weather phenomenon that occurs in Burlington County is radiative cooling in the Pine Barrens, a large pine forest and reserve that takes up a good portion of Southern and Eastern Burlington County. Due to sandy soil, on clear and dry nights these areas might be  colder than the surrounding areas, and there is a shorter frost-free season in these places. The sandy soil of the Pinelands loses heat much faster than the other soils or urban surfaces (concrete, asphalt) in the region, and so achieves a much lower temperature at night than the rest of the county. This effect is far less pronounced on moist, cloudy, or windy nights, as these three factors greatly reduce the radiative cooling of the sandy soil.

Demographics

2020 census
As of the 2020 United States census, the county had 461,860 people, 170,074 households, and 170,074 families. The county's racial makeup was 65.6% White, 16.8% African American, 0.25% Native American, 5.68% Asian, and 8.08% from two or more races. Hispanic or Latino of any race were 8.74% of the population.

There were 170,074 households, of which 31.8% had children under the age of 18 living with them, 53.02% were married couples living together, 26.8% had a female householder with no husband present, 14.6% had a male householder with no wife present and 29.4% were non-families. 30.67% of all households were made up of individuals, and 11.4% had someone living alone who was 65 years of age or older. The average household size was 2.55 and the average family size was 3.08.

About 21.1% of the county's population was under age 18, 8.3% was from age 18 to 24, 37.1% was from age 15 to 44, and 17.4% was age 65 or older. The median age was 41.4 years. The gender makeup of the county was 49.23% male and 50.76% female. For every 100 females, there were 97.0 males.

The county's median household income was $88,797, and the median family income was $105,488. About 5.5% of the population were below the poverty line, including 8.5% of those under age 18 and 4.5% of those age 65 or over.

2010 census

Economy
Based on data from the Bureau of Economic Analysis, Burlington County had a gross domestic product (GDP) of $25.2 billion in 2018, which was ranked 10th in the state and represented an increase of 2.0% from the previous year.

In 2015, the county had a per capita personal income of $55,227, the tenth-highest in New Jersey and ranked 228th of 3,113 counties in the United States. The Bureau of Economic Analysis ranked the county as having the 158th-highest per capita income of all 3,113 counties in the United States (and the 11th-highest in New Jersey) as of 2009.

Government

County government
Burlington County is governed by a board of county commissioners comprised of five members elected at-large by the voters in partisan elections that serve staggered three-year terms, with one or two seats up for election each year in a three-year cycle. Burlington County Board of County Commissioners have both administrative and policy-making powers. Each Burlington County Commissioner oversees a particular area of service: Administration & Natural Resources; Education & Justice; Public Works & Veteran Services; Public Safety & Health and Human Services; and Hospital and Medical Services & Elections. In 2016, commissioners were paid $10,553 and the commissioner director was paid an annual salary of $11,553; the commissioner salaries are the lowest of the state's 21 counties.

, Burlington County's Commissioners are
Director Felicia Hopson (D, Willingboro Township, term as commissioner ends December 31, 2024; term as director ends 2023),
Deputy Director Tom Pullion (D, Edgewater Park, term as commissioner and as deputy director ends 2023),
Allison Eckel (D, Medford, 2025),
Daniel J. O'Connell (D, Delran Township, 2024), and
Balvir Singh (D, Burlington Township, 2023).

Pursuant to Article VII Section II of the New Jersey State Constitution, each county in New Jersey is required to have three elected administrative officials known as "constitutional officers." These officers are the County Clerk and County Surrogate (both elected for five-year terms of office) and the County Sheriff (elected for a three-year term). Burlington County's Constitutional Officers are
County Clerk Joanne Schwartz (R, Southampton Township, 2023)
Sheriff James H. Kostoplis (D, Bordentown, 2025) and
Surrogate Brian J. Carlin (D, Burlington Township, 2026).

The Burlington County Prosecutor is LaChia L. Bradshaw of the Columbus section of Mansfield Township who was nominated by Governor of New Jersey Phil Murphy and sworn into office in July 2022 after confirmation by the New Jersey Senate. Burlington County constitutes Vicinage 3 of the New Jersey Superior Court and is seated at the Burlington County Courts Facility and County Office Building in Mount Holly, with additional space in the Olde Courthouse and Rancocas Building, also in Mount Holly; the Assignment Judge for Vicinage 3 is Ronald E. Bookbinder.

In the 2012 general election, Democrats Aimee Belgard and Joanne Schwartz won the election as Freeholders (now Commissioners) over Republican incumbents Bruce Garganio and Mary Ann O'Brien, despite being outspent by a six-to-one margin. However, in 2014, both Garganio and O'Brien were successful in winning back seats on the Freeholder board, while Aimee Belgard lost her bid for U.S. Congress, losing the popular vote in both Ocean and Burlington counties. In 2015, Republican newcomers Kate Gibbs and Ryan Peters ousted Belgard and Schwartz, again giving the Republican Party full control on the Freeholder Board. In 2017, Democratic newcomers Tom Pullion and Balvir Singh defeated Republican incumbents Bruce Garganio and Linda Hughes, winning the county election for Democrats for the first time in a non-presidential election year in decades.

In 2018, Democrat Joanne Schwartz defeated Republican incumbent Tim Tyler in the County Clerk election. In the freeholder elections, Democrats Felicia Hopson and George Youngkin defeated Republican incumbents Kate Gibbs and Linda Hughes. This gave Democrats a 4-1 majority, gaining control of the Freeholder Board for the first time since 1975. George Youngkin won despite having suspended his campaign due to a past domestic violence charge that was later dropped. He resigned on January 2, the day after being sworn in. Democrats appointed Daniel J. O’Connell to replace him, until a special election could be held on November 5, 2019. In 2019, Democrat Anthony Basantis defeated Republican Michael Ditzel in the Sheriff election, replacing retired Republican Sheriff Jean Stanfield, who was elected to the State Assembly. In the regular election for one freeholder position, Democrat Linda A. Hynes defeated Republican Incumbent Latham Tiver. In the special election for the remaining 2 years of George Youngkin's term, incumbent Democrat Daniel J. O’Connell, who had originally been appointed to the seat, defeated Republican Lee Schneider. The election gave Democrats control over every county-wide office, except the Surrogate. However, the majority of Burlington County's state legislators are still Republicans.

In April 2022, Allison Eckel was appointed to fill the seat expiring in December 2022 that became vacant after Linda Hynes resigned to take office as a New Jersey Superior Court judge. The following month, Burlington County Republicans filed suit, claiming that Eckel should be removed from office and the seat left vacant until November 2022, because the statutory timeline for the appointment was not followed.

Federal representatives 
Two federal Congressional Districts cover the county. Most of the county is in the 3rd District, with a sliver in the west being in the 1st District.

State representatives

Law enforcement 
The Burlington County Sheriff's Department is headed by a sheriff elected to a three-year term. The sheriff is Anthony Basantis, elected in 2020. It is a member of the New York-New Jersey Regional Fugitive Task Force. The department has an Operations Division and a Courts Division. The Operations Division is headed by an undersheriff and includes Sheriff, Undersheriff, and Sheriff's Officer Chief. The division is split into a Warrants Unit and a Courts Division The Courts Division is headed by an undersheriff and includes a sheriff's officer, a lieutenant, four sergeants and forty-seven officers. This section provides security to the courts and runs the Sheriff's Emergency Response Team, a Warrant Unit and a Community Policing Unit. The Warrant Unit includes the department's canine unit. Notable former sheriffs include William Norton Shinn (1825-1828), Samuel A. Dobbins (1854-1857), and Jean Stanfield (2001-2019).

The county is also home to the majority of  megabase, Joint Base McGuire-Dix-Lakehurst, the entire Air Force Activity / Headquarters of JB MDL McGuire Air Force Base, and all of the main portions of the Army Support Activity, Fort Dix and most training grounds / shooting ranges lie within the county borders in New Hanover, North Hanover, Pemberton, and Springfield townships.

Politics 
While historically a swing county in New Jersey politics, Burlington County has become reliably Democratic in recent decades, including in more affluent communities that have developed new residential areas, such as Medford, Mount Laurel, Moorestown, and Evesham Township (as opposed to areas along the Delaware River occupied by minority and working-class households). Burlington County has closely matched statewide totals in recent presidential, senatorial, and gubernatorial elections, making it an important bellwether. As of October 1, 2021, there were a total of 353,613 registered voters in Burlington County, of whom 139,745 (39.5%) were registered as Democrats, 90,754 (25.7%) were registered as Republicans and 118,992 (33.7%) were registered as unaffiliated. There were 4,122 voters (1.2%) registered to other parties. Among the county's 2010 Census population, 65.2% were registered to vote, included 76.8% of those ages 18 and over.

In the 2020 presidential election, however, the county voted a few points more Democratic than the state as a whole. In the 2016 election, the county mostly voted in the line with the state. In the 2012 presidential election, Democrat Barack Obama received 126,377 votes countywide, ahead of Republican Mitt Romney with 87,401 votes (40.2%) and other candidates with 2,158 votes (1.0%), among the 217,428 ballots cast by the county's 291,760 registered voters, for a turnout of 74.5%. In the 2008 presidential election, Democrat Barack Obama received 131,219 votes in the county, ahead of Republican John McCain with 89,626 votes (39.9%) and other candidates with 2,329 votes (1.0%), among the 224,740 ballots cast by the county's 280,836 registered voters, for a turnout of 80.0%.

|}

In the 2009 gubernatorial election, Republican Chris Christie received 66,723 votes in Burlington County (48.0%), ahead of Democrat Jon Corzine with 63,114 votes (45.4%), Independent Chris Daggett with 6,333 votes (4.6%) and other candidates with 1,661 votes (1.2%), among the 139,030 ballots cast by the county's 282,209 registered voters, yielding a 49.3% turnout rate. In the 2013 gubernatorial election, Republican Chris Christie received 79,220 votes countywide, ahead of Democrat Barbara Buono with 46,161 votes (35.8%) and other candidates with 1,512 votes (1.2%), among the 129,060 ballots cast by the county's 289,900 registered voters, yielding a 44.5% turnout. In the 2017 gubernatorial election, Republican Kim Guadagno received 52,191 (41.8%) of the vote, and Democrat Phil Murphy received 70,453 (56.5%) of the vote. In the 2021 gubernatorial election, Republican Jack Ciattarelli received 46.1% of the vote (71,772 ballots cast) to Democrat Phil Murphy's 53.3% (82,877 votes).

Municipalities 

Municipalities have their own municipal courts, which handle traffic and minor criminal and civil matters, and the New Jersey Superior Court handles more serious cases. The 40 municipalities in Burlington County (with 2010 Census data for population, housing units, and area) are:

Education

Tertiary education
Rowan College at Burlington County is a two-year public community college serving students from Burlington County. The school, located at campuses in Pemberton and Mount Laurel and was founded in 1966 and opened to students in 1969.

K-12 schools
School districts in Burlington County include:

K-12:

 Bordentown Regional School District
 Burlington County Special Services School District – County special education for ages 3–21
 Burlington Township School District
 Cinnaminson Township Public Schools
 City of Burlington Public School District
 Delran Township School District
 Florence Township School District
 Maple Shade School District
 Moorestown Township Public Schools
 Palmyra Public Schools
 Pemberton Township School District
 Riverside School District
 Willingboro Public Schools

Secondary
 Burlington County Institute of Technology
 Lenape Regional School District
 Northern Burlington Regional School District
 Pinelands Regional School District
 Rancocas Valley Regional School District

Elementary

 Beverly City Schools
 Chesterfield School District
 Delanco Township School District
 Eastampton Township School District
 Edgewater Park School District
 Evesham Township School District
 Hainesport Township School District
 Lumberton Township School District
 Mansfield Public Schools
 Medford Lakes School District
 Medford Township Public Schools
 Mount Holly Township Public Schools
 Mount Laurel Schools
 New Hanover Township School District
 North Hanover Township School District
 Riverton School District
 Shamong Township School District
 Southampton Township Schools
 Springfield Township School District
 Tabernacle School District
 Washington Township School District
 Westampton Township Schools
 Woodland Township School District

Non-operating
 Bass River Township School District

The U.S. Census Bureau lists Joint Base McGuire-Dix-Lakehurst in Burlington County as having its own school district. Students attend area school district public schools, as the Department of Defense Education Activity (DoDEA) does not operate any schools on that base. Students on-post in the McGuire and Dix areas (McGuire Air Force Base and Fort Dix) may attend one of the following in their grade levels, with all siblings in a family taking the same choice: North Hanover Township (for elementary), Northern Burlington County Regional (for secondary), and Pemberton Township (for K-12).

Libraries
The Burlington County Library became the first county library in New Jersey when it was established in 1921 in Mount Holly. Library service grew in popularity and several moves ensued as more space became a necessity. By 1971, a new headquarters facility had been constructed, Cinnaminson Township and Bordentown had joined the system as branches, and a bookmobile visited areas without local facilities. Medford and Evesham Township had joined the system by 1975. The Pemberton Township Branch joined the system in 1987. Maple Shade Township became a branch in April 2001 while Riverton, the newest branch, joined in December 2003. With a larger network of nine additional member libraries, the system provides a range of services to its residents.

Transportation

Roads and highways

A variety of major routes were constructed through Burlington County. Major county roads include County Route 528, County Route 530, County Route 532, County Route 534 (only in Shamong Township), County Route 537, County Route 541, County Route 542, County Route 543, County Route 544, County Route 545 and County Route 563. State Routes that pass through are Route 38, Route 68, Route 70, Route 72, Route 73, Route 90 (only in Cinnaminson Township), and Route 413 (only in Burlington). U.S. Routes that traverse are U.S. Route 9 (only in Bass River Township), U.S. Route 130 and U.S. Route 206. Limited access roads include the Garden State Parkway (a  stretch in Bass River Township), Interstate 295 and the New Jersey Turnpike (a portion of Interstate 95).

The county has five Turnpike interchanges: Exit 4 in Mount Laurel, Exit 5 in Westampton, Exit 6A in Florence Township, Exit 6 in Mansfield Township, and Exit 7 in Bordentown Township.

The New Jersey Turnpike Authority has widened the Parkway to three lanes in each direction from exit 80 in South Toms River, Ocean County to exit 30 in Somers Point, Atlantic County, which included widening of bridges at several river crossings. The Authority extended the 'dual-dual' configuration (inner car lanes and outer car / truck / bus lanes) on the turnpike south to Exit 6 from its former end at Exit 8A in Monroe Township, Middlesex County. This was finished in early November 2014.

Bridges

The Burlington County Bridge Commission maintains the Tacony–Palmyra Bridge and the Burlington–Bristol Bridge, both of which cross the Delaware River. The agency also maintains several bridges along CR 543, including the Riverside–Delanco Bridge over the Rancocas Creek.

The Tacony–Palmyra Bridge is a combination steel tied arch and double-leaf bascule bridge across the Delaware River that connects New Jersey Route 73 in Palmyra with Pennsylvania Route 73 in the Tacony section of Philadelphia. After 18 months of construction, the bridge opened in 1929, replacing ferry service that had operated between the two places since 1922.

The Burlington–Bristol Bridge is a truss bridge with a lift span crossing the Delaware River from Burlington to Bristol Township, Pennsylvania. Construction of the bridge started on April 1, 1930, and the bridge opened to traffic on May 2, 1931.

The 13.5 million toll-paying trips on the Burlington–Bristol and Tacony–Palmyra bridges and the per-car toll of $4 (reduced to $3 with E-ZPass) for cars heading into Pennsylvania generated $51 million in revenue in 2016.

The Riverside–Delanco Bridge is a truss bridge with a central swing span that carries County Route 543 across the Rancocas Creek, between Riverside Township and Delanco Township. The current bridge was built in 1934–1935 to replace the 1901 bridge, which itself replaced an 1870 structure.

Public transportation
The River Line is a diesel light-rail system operated for NJ Transit by the Southern New Jersey Rail Group on a former Pennsylvania Railroad line between the Trenton Transit Center in Trenton and the Walter Rand Transportation Center and other stations in Camden, with 11 stations in the county.

NJ Transit operates bus service into Philadelphia on the following routes; 317, 406, 409 414, and 417 routes, and into Camden only on the following routes; 407, 413, 418, 419 and 457; and to Atlantic City on the 559 route.

Academy Bus Lines operates buses from Mount Holly, Mount Laurel, Westampton and Willingboro Township to New York City's Port Authority Bus Terminal in Midtown Manhattan as well as the Wall Street area of Lower Manhattan.

The BurLink bus service provides three routes, under service funded by the county and operated by Stout's Transportation, providing connections to NJ Transit's bus and rail service.

Wineries
 DeMastro Vineyards (Southampton Township)
 Iron Plow Vineyards (in the Columbus section of Mansfield Township)
 Valenzano Winery (Shamong Township)

See also

 National Register of Historic Places listings in Burlington County, New Jersey
 Seal of Burlington County, New Jersey

References

External links

 
 Burlington County Chamber of Commerce
 
 Sheriffs of Burlington County, New Jersey

 
1694 establishments in New Jersey
Geography of the Pine Barrens (New Jersey)
Populated places established in 1694
South Jersey